Yong Ji or Lü Ji(呂己), personal name Zi Dian or Zi Zhou, was a Shang dynasty King of China.

In the Records of the Grand Historian he was listed by Sima Qian as the eighth Shang king, succeeding his brother Xiao Jia. He was enthroned in the year of Jiaxu with Bo as his capital. He ruled for 12 years, was given the posthumous name Yong Ji and was succeeded by brother Tai Wu.

Oracle bone script inscriptions on bones unearthed at Yinxu alternatively record that he was the eighth Shang king succeeding his brother Tai Wu, given the posthumous name Lü Ji and succeeded by his nephew Zhong Ding. The economy began to decline under his rule.

References

Year of birth unknown
Year of death unknown
Shang dynasty kings